Hervé Cuillandre (born 1967) is a French novelist and photographer.

Cuillandre was born in Rennes, Ille-et-Vilaine, and studied social behaviour and human destiny.

Bibliography 

 Un monde meilleur: Et si l'intellignce artificielle humanisait notre avenir (Nonfiction - 2018)
 Elsewhere (Photography - 2007)
 L'humanité en mouvement (Nonfiction - 2006)
 L'entreprise sociale (Nonfiction - 2006)
 La gestion de projet (Nonfiction - 2006)
 Marche et crève! (Fiction - 2005)
 Une nuit au bureau (Fiction - 2004)

References

External links
 Official site

1967 births
Living people
Artists from Rennes
20th-century French novelists
20th-century French male writers
21st-century French novelists
French photographers
French male novelists
21st-century French male writers
Writers from Rennes